Bikanta is a startup biotech company that develops clinical products which focus on the detection of cancer through the insertion of fluorescent nanodiamonds.

History 
The company was founded in 2013 and is based in Berkeley, California. Bikanta raised $120k in seed funding in 2014. In 2014, Bikanta participated in the Y Combinator program and was one of four companies backed by Y Combinator.

Awards and recognitions 
Named one of four Best Diagnostic startups by QB3.
Won first place at the 11th Annual Business Plan Competition of The Silicon Valley Boomer Venture Summit.
Participated in the California Life Sciences Institute's FAST Advisory Program.

References

Life sciences industry
Technology companies based in the San Francisco Bay Area
Biotechnology companies of the United States
2013 establishments in California
Companies based in Alameda County, California
Biotechnology companies established in 2013